João Paulo da Silva Araújo (born 2 June 1988), commonly known as João Paulo, is a Brazilian professional footballer who plays as a forward for Kairat. He received Kazakhstani citizenship in 2022.

Career

South Korea
On 20 February 2011, João Paulo joined South Korean K-League side Gwangju FC on loan from ABC, but signed a permanent deal five months later in July.

Following Daejeon Citizen's relegation to the K League Challenge, he joined Incheon United in January 2014.

Botev Plovdiv
On 16 June 2016, João Paulo joined Bulgarian club Botev Plovdiv, and was presented to the public alongside two fellow new Brazilian signings. On 29 June, he scored his unofficial first goal for the club, in a 5–0 thrashing over FC Oborishte in a pre-season friendly.

On 15 August 2016, João Paulo scored a goal for the 3–2 win over Slavia Sofia. On 27 August, he also scored the winning goal in a 2–1 home victory over Neftochimic Burgas.

João Paulo scored a hat-trick for the 4–0 win over FC Lokomotiv Gorna Oryahovitsa on 17 September. Four days later, on 21 September, he scored twice for the 6–3 away win over FC Pirin Gotse Delchev for the Bulgarian Cup. At the end of the same week he scored another goal for the 2–1 away win over Dunav Ruse.

On 16 October João Paulo continued his goalscoring streak during a 4–3 away win over Beroe Stara Zagora in the regional Thracian Derby. He scored a goal during the 3–0 win over PFC Neftochimic Burgas on 27 October. Three days later, during the 1–1 draw with Levski Sofia he scored a goal in the 13th second following an assist from Todor Nedelev. João Paulo scored again on 3 November during the 3–1 away defeat to PFC Montana.

Ludogorets Razgrad
On 6 January 2017, after several weeks of negotiations, Paulo joined Bulgarian champions Ludogorets Razgrad at a reported transfer fee of €150,000.

Return to Botev Plovdiv
On 27 February 2018, João Paulo returned to Botev Plovdiv on a loan until the end of the season. On 12 March, on day when Botev Plovdiv celebrated 106 years from its foundation, João Paulo scored a goal in a 4–2 away win over FC Vereya. On 21 April João Paulo scored a goal during the 2–2 draw with FC Vereya. On 29 April João Paulo scored a goal for the 2–1 home win over CSKA Sofia. A week later, on 5 May, he scored again but this time Botev Plovdiv was dramatically defeated with 3–2 by Levski Sofia. On 11 May, João Paulo scored twice for the 2–1 win over Beroe Stara Zagora and received the award for man of the match.

Kairat
On 6 July 2021, Kairat announced the signing of João Paulo from Ordabasy, on a 18-month contract.

Career statistics

References

External links 

João Paulo at sambafoot.com

1988 births
Living people
Brazilian footballers
Association football forwards
Association football midfielders
K League 1 players
Campeonato Brasileiro Série B players
Campeonato Brasileiro Série C players
First Professional Football League (Bulgaria) players
Kazakhstan Premier League players
Gwangju FC players
Daejeon Hana Citizen FC players
ABC Futebol Clube players
Botev Plovdiv players
PFC Ludogorets Razgrad players
PFC Ludogorets Razgrad II players
FC Ordabasy players
FC Kairat players
Brazilian expatriate footballers
Brazilian expatriate sportspeople in South Korea
Expatriate footballers in South Korea
Brazilian expatriate sportspeople in Bulgaria
Expatriate footballers in Bulgaria
Naturalised citizens of Kazakhstan
People from Natal, Rio Grande do Norte
Sportspeople from Rio Grande do Norte